Not for Want of Trying is the debut album from UK instrumental rock band Maybeshewill, released on 12 May 2008.

Track listing

Production 
The title track 'Not For Want Of Trying' samples Howard Beale's 'mad as hell' speech from the 1976 film Network.

References

External links 
 

2008 debut albums
Maybeshewill albums